Enrique Andrés Antía Behrens (born November 30, 1949) is a Uruguayan agricultural engineer and politician of the National Party (PN), serving as Intendant of Maldonado since November 26, 2020.

Graduated from the University of the Republic, he has an agricultural engineering degree. He served as an Extension Technician for the National Milk Producers Cooperative (Conaprole) in the departments of Maldonado and Rocha for twenty years.

Family 
Born in Maldonado as the son of the architect Enrique Antía Arlo and Consuelo Behrens Muñoz, Antía is the first cousin of the former Minister of Transport and Public Works, Lucio Cáceres Behrens, on his maternal side, and his mother is the first cousin of the well-known actress China Zorrilla.

Political career 
He began his militancy as a member of the Nationalist University Movement (MUN). In 1985, when democracy returned, he was elected edil of the Maldonado Departmental Board. 

In the 2000 municipal elections, he was elected Intendant of Maldonado, a position he held until 2005. While in the 2004 general election, he was elected Senator of the Republic for the 46th Legislature, as part of the Wilsonist Current faction. From that year to 2014 he was part of the Board of the National Party. 

In the 2005 municipal elections, Antía was again a candidate for Intendant, being defeated by the Broad Front nominee Óscar de los Santos. In 2010 he ran for the Intendancy of Maldonado, being defeated by De los Santos, who was re-elected. In July of that year he was appointed to the board of directors of the National Administration of Power Plants and Transmissions (UTE).

In 2015 he ran again for the post of Intendant of Maldonado, being elected for five years and ending the 10-year leftist rule in the department. In 2019 he was pre-candidate for president for the National Party in the presidential primaries; he obtained 7.51% of the votes, being defeated by Luis Lacalle Pou, who was the candidate in the general election. 

On February 6, 2020, he resigned as Intendant to dedicate himself to the re-election campaign. In the municipal elections of September, he was re-elected Intendant of Maldonado, with 37.4% of the votes. He took office for the third time on November 26.

References

External links 

 

Living people
1949 births
Intendants of Maldonado Department
Members of the Senate of Uruguay
Members of the Chamber of Representatives of Uruguay
National Party (Uruguay) politicians
University of the Republic (Uruguay) alumni